The 1997 Campeonato Nacional Clausura Copa Banco del Estado was the 66th Chilean League top flight tournament, Colo-Colo were the champions, winning their 21st title.

Standings

Results

Topscorers

References

External links
 RSSSF Chile 1997

Primera División de Chile seasons
Chile
1997 in Chilean football